Houston, Houston, Do You Read? is a novella by James Tiptree Jr. (pseudonym of Alice Sheldon). It won a Nebula Award for Best Novella in 1976 and a Hugo Award for Best Novella in 1977.

The novella first appeared in the anthology Aurora: Beyond Equality, edited by Vonda N. McIntyre and Susan J. Anderson, published by Fawcett in May 1976. It was subsequently reprinted several times (amongst others in the James Tiptree collections Star Songs of an Old Primate in 1978 and Her Smoke Rose Up Forever in 1990) and in 1989 was published in a Tor Doubles mass market paperback (number eleven in that series) with the flipside novella "Souls" by Joanna Russ.

Plot summary
The story is narrated in the third person from the point of view of Dr. Orren Lorimer, the science officer of the spaceship Sunbird, which is sent on a circumsolar mission at some time in the last two decades of the twentieth century. It is a three-man mission, the other two men being the commander, Major Norman Davis ("Dave") and Captain Bernhard Geirr ("Bud"); they have shared tight quarters, boring prepackaged food, and barely adequate life support systems for over a year. Having sustained considerable damage from a solar flare, they have passed around the sun and look forward to returning to their families on Earth. 

When they try to contact Mission Control in Houston, the only radio sources they can find are women, who gradually convince them that the solar flare has sent the Sunbird about three hundred years into the future. The women are from Earth, they have a lunar base and spaceships, and they rescue the Sunbird'''s crew. Their ship, the Gloria, turns out to be very large; the four women, with the help of "Andy", maintain an ecosystem and enjoy fresh food, comfortable sleep, and exercise. The Sunbird men (especially Dave, the mission leader) are dismayed to learn that they have no ranks or hierarchy, either on the ships or on Earth. Lorimer learns that the one man, Andy, is actually a woman on male hormones. In fact, no y chromosomes at all have survived into the present time on Earth, due to an epidemic. The women reproduce by cloning 11,000 survivors of a disaster that wiped out all the rest of humanity. Each of the 11,000 women has produced a lineage of cloned sisters/daughters who develop great self-knowledge through these relationships. 

The crew of the Gloria test the three men using a truth drug. Bud, the second in command, tries to rape one of the women, all the while insulting her, and hits Andy when the latter tries to interfere. Lorimer watches Bud's activities, always admiring the masculinity of violent men. Dave, when he learns the truth, pulls a gun and crucifix and starts giving everyone orders; Lorimer helps the women disarm him, accepting the women's decision that men pose too great a threat to their society, and must be killed. Although Lorimer is "more human" (as one woman says) than the other two, he, like Bud and Dave, finds a life without a patriarchal hierarchy unthinkable.

Themes
Feminism
James Tiptree Jr. is a science fiction writer who rose to fame through her discussion of gender and nature in the 1970s. Tiptree's novella Houston, Houston, Do you Read works to help readers understand the nature of inequality while promoting women's rights. Tiptree also tackled the nature of gender through (de)naturalizing male violence.  In the novella, Dave and Bud express the most hatred for women. Both men have strong masculine identities, and they think that they were sent to the future to “fulfill” the women's lives. Dave and Bud both believe that women are unfit to run a prosperous society on their own. Although Lorimer is also a man, he struggles with virility. He desperately wants to connect with Dave and Buck on a masculine level. Tiptree expresses each male character with disguised misogyny in order to show the realities of discrimination. Each man discriminates against the women in a different way. Dave uses his biblical Christianity as an excuse and explanation for why men are superior to women. He believes that God has ordained that women be subservient to men in all ways. Conversely, Bud is not Christian, but believes that he (and all men) are so desired by women that they cannot live without him. He believes that women are unintelligent and physically weak and, therefore, biologically inferior to men. He is quite openly misogynistic and this grows to physical abuse. Dave sees himself as a God who is sent to the future in order to conquer the women and overpower them because he is a man and the “ideal” ruler who knows best. Dave uses his religion as a valid explanation to subjugate the women. Finally, Lorimer does not want to admit that he believes women are inferior to men. He wrestles with his carnal desires to dominate women, to rape them, and to abuse them. However, Lorimer is aware of the unacceptability of these desires and tries to advocate for the women. It can be noted, though, that the only reason Lorimer is trying to appease these women and not dominate them is because they have the upper hand. If the situation were different, it is not unreasonable to assume that Lorimer would stand by Dave and Bud and physically, mentally, and emotionally dominate, control, and abuse these women. Although Lorimer is not an “alpha” male like his fellow astronauts, he desires to hold masculine qualities deep down. Lorimer follows Dave and Buck's lead regarding how they treat the women. Lorimer's traits affect the story because his actions prove that men tend to hold similar qualities. Although Lorimer is not a harsh character, deep down, he also expresses shades of misogyny. Tiptree uses Lorimer's character to show that all men express similar desires.

Male Violence
"Houston, Houston, Do You Read?" is dominated by a theme of male violence. The drug that the male crew is given on the rescue ship causes them to verbally express every thought they have, but to do so unknowingly. This allows the female crew of the ship to have insight into what is going on in their minds. It can be inferred through the final paragraphs of the novella that the clones never truly intended to bring the men back to earth alive; it would cause to great a risk to their way of life. Lady Blue tells Lorimer, "...the fighting is long over. It ended when you (men) did, I believe. We can hardly turn you loose on Earth, and we simply have no facilities for people with your emotional problems". The women of Earth are no longer accustomed to the violence that males perpetuated when they, too, inhabited Earth. The display of male violence reaches a climax when Bud assaults Judy. His sexual violence is apparent, not caring about consent or safety. His only goal is his own satisfaction and hurting women in the process is of no concern to him. Bud is not the only of the three men who exhibit violent tendencies, however. Dave also shows his violence when he wields a gun, attempting to take command of the women through a threat of violence. The women are unfazed and they unarm and eliminate the threat he posed them. Lorimer is the least violent of the three, but this does not mean that he is without violent tendencies. He also has fantasies of rape and these he has spoken aloud (unknowingly) because of the drug he was administered. Lorimer is enthralled with watching Bud rape Judy. He doesn't want Bud to stop, yet knows that the situation is violent and unacceptable. All three men show their violent natures, particularly their violent sexual natures. The women see this, and suggest to the readers that this type of violence is no longer a problem for people on Earth. They decide that allowing these men to live poses too great risk to their society and cannot allow the male violence that would certainly follow these three men into their world.

Environmentalism
The clone's ship is equipped with a greenhouse which acts as a waste management and oxygen-providing system. The waste fertilizes the plants which take in CO2 and sunlight when the windows are towards the sun, then they pump out oxygen. The women also have animals aboard: crickets, chickens, and iguanas are a few of the animals named. The women have blended technology and nature to provide them with the best of both. The women of Earth seem to be quite environmentally conscious and this commitment to nature is not ignored, even in space. Author Murphy Graham suggests that these women also exhibit insect-like tendencies. The women are like a hive of bees or a colony of ants; they work together with a common goal and internal sabotage and violence from those of their own kind is rare if present at all. Lorimer notes this hive-like mentality when he observes two of the women talking while exercising, "...like ants, he thinks. They twiddle their antennae together every time they meet".

Religion as a Stronghold
Dave sees the women as sheep that are lost without some type of control under a male figurehead. However, it seems that Tiptree is taking ideals of religious oppression that held true in the Patriarchal society and trying to implement them in this Matriarchy. Dave takes that figurehead place for himself despite aiming to realign women under God's control. However, just like many have done with the religion of the past, the higher power is not promoted in any form by Dave doing this; only Dave sees the benefit.

Adaptations and influences
"Houston, Houston, Do You Read?" was adapted as a radio drama for the National Public Radio series Sci-Fi Radio. It originally aired as two half-hour shows, February 4 & 11, 1990.

"Houston, Houston, Do You Read?" is referenced in the dialogue of the first issue of the post-apocalyptic comic Y: The Last Man, which also depicts a plague that kills off all men, three astronauts who survived the plague in orbit, and a new female society that survives by cloning.

References
Notes

Bibliography

 Clute, John and Peter Nicholls. The Encyclopedia of Science Fiction. New York City: St. Martin's Griffin, 1993 (2nd edition 1995). .
 Murphy, Graham J. Considering Her Ways: In(ter)secting Matriarchal Utopias. Science Fiction Studies, 00917729, July 2008, Vol. 35, Issue 2, Humanities Full Text (H.W. Wilson). In this work Murphy looks at the way utopian/dystopian literature blends humanity, society, nature, and technology. Murphy notes how Triptree, as well, combined these notions and took an almost "insect"-like approach to humanity, in which the mother is the primary care-taker of young and the males serve little to no purpose beyond providing DNA for reproduction.
Pearson, C. (1977). Women's Fantasies and Feminist Utopias. Frontiers: A Journal of Women Studies, 2(3), 50-61. doi:10.2307/3346349. In this article, Pearson notes how women authors perceive utopias. They, like Triptree, envision a world where male violence and sexual inequalities are not existent. In Triptree's case, she created a world in which men do not exist at all.
 Phillips, Julie. James Tiptree, Jr: The Double Life of Alice B. Sheldon. New York: St. Martin's Press, 2006. . A thorough biography, with insight into Sheldon's life and work. Extensive quotation from her correspondence, journals, and other papers. Times Literary Supplement review 

External links
 
 "Houston, Houston, Do You Read?" (Selection 17) from the NPR series Sci-Fi Radio'' (20 & 21), February 4 & 11, 1990 (55:32)

Science fiction short stories
Hugo Award for Best Novella winning works
Feminist science fiction novels
Fiction about the Sun
Post-apocalyptic novels
1976 short stories
Single-gender worlds
Nebula Award for Best Novella-winning works
Works by James Tiptree Jr.
LGBT speculative fiction novels
American LGBT novels
1970s LGBT novels
Novels about time travel
Novels set in outer space